The  Houston Oilers season was the 32nd season and their 22nd in the National Football League (NFL). Haywood Jeffires would become the second Oiler to have 100 receptions in a season. The first Oiler to accomplish the feat was Charley Hennigan in 1964. Jeffires would be the fifth receiver in NFL history to have a 100 reception season. The Oilers scored 386 points and gave up 251 points. The franchise earned its first division title since the AFL-NFL merger, having last won a division title in the 1967 American Football League season. The franchise finished the season with 11 wins compared to 5 losses and appeared twice on Monday Night Football.

Offseason

NFL draft

Personnel

Staff

Roster

Regular season 
 October 13, 1991 – Warren Moon threw for 423 yards against the New York Jets.
 November 10, 1991 – Warren Moon threw for 432 yards against the Dallas Cowboys.
 October 13, 1991 – Haywood Jeffires set an Oilers record with most receptions in one game with 13.

Schedule

Games summaries

Week 1 vs Raiders

Week 14

Standings

Playoffs

AFC Wild Card 

After leading 14–10 at halftime, the Oilers stopped the Jets twice inside the 5-yard line in the second half to preserve the victory. Houston quarterback Warren Moon threw two touchdowns in the first half, both to Ernest Givins for 5 and 20 yards. This would be the team's last playoff win while playing in Houston and would not win another playoff game until the Music City Miracle during the 1999 playoffs, their third season in Tennessee and their first season as the Titans.

AFC Divisional Playoff 

Trailing 24–23 with 2:07 left in the game, quarterback John Elway led the Broncos from their own 2-yard line to the winning 28-yard field goal with 16 seconds remaining. On the drive, he converted on two fourth downs. On fourth down and 6 from the Denver 28, he rushed for 7 yards. Then on fourth down and 10, he completed a 44-yard pass to wide receiver Vance Johnson.

The Oilers jumped to a 14–0 lead with quarterback Warren Moon's two touchdown passes to wide receivers Haywood Jeffires and Drew Hill for 15 and 9 yards, respectively. Elway then completed a 10-yard touchdown to Johnson, but kicker David Treadwell missed the extra point. Moon responded by throwing a 6-yard touchdown to wide receiver Curtis Duncan to give Houston a 21–6 lead, but Denver running back Greg Lewis scored a 1-yard touchdown before halftime. In the second half, the Oilers were limited to only a 25-yard field goal by kicker Al Del Greco, which gave Houston a 24–16 lead in the fourth quarter. The Broncos then marched 80 yards to score on Lewis' 1-yard touchdown run to cut the deficit to 24–23.

Elway's comeback is now known solely as The Drive II.

Awards and records 
 Haywood Jeffires – Houston Oilers record, most receptions in one game, (13)
 Haywood Jeffires, All Pro selection
 Haywood Jeffires, Pro Bowl selection
 Warren Moon, Pro Bowl selection
 Warren Moon, Houston Oilers record, most passing yards in a season (4,690)
 Warren Moon, NFL leader, most passing yards in a season (4,690)

Milestones 
 Haywood Jeffires – 1st 100 reception season 
 Haywood Jeffires – 2nd 1,000 yard receiving season (1,181 yards)
 Warren Moon, 2nd 4,000 yard passing season (4,690)
 Warren Moon, 3rd 400 yard passing game (423 vs. New York Jets)
 Warren Moon, 4th 400 yard passing game (432 vs. Dallas Cowboys)

References

External links 
 1991 Houston Oilers at Pro-Football-Reference.com

Houston Oilers
Houston Oilers seasons
AFC Central championship seasons
Houston